A ramjet, or athodyd (aero thermodynamic duct), is a form of airbreathing jet engine that uses the forward motion of the engine to produce thrust. Since it produces no thrust when stationary (no ram air) ramjet-powered vehicles require an assisted take-off like a rocket assist to accelerate it to a speed where it begins to produce thrust.

Ramjets can be particularly useful in applications requiring a small and simple mechanism for high-speed use, such as missiles. The US, Canada, and UK had widespread ramjet powered missile defenses during the 1960s onward, such as the CIM-10 Bomarc and Bloodhound. They have also been used successfully, though not efficiently, as tip jets on the ends of helicopter rotors.

Ramjets differ from pulsejets, which use an intermittent combustion; ramjets employ a continuous combustion process.

As speed increases, the efficiency of a ramjet starts to drop as the air temperature in the inlet increases due to compression. As the inlet temperature gets closer to the exhaust temperature, less energy can be extracted in the form of thrust. To produce a usable amount of thrust at yet higher speeds, the ramjet must be modified so that the incoming air is not compressed (and therefore heated) nearly as much. This means that the air flowing through the combustion chamber is still moving very fast (relative to the engine), in fact it will be supersonic—hence the name supersonic-combustion ramjet, or scramjet.

History

Cyrano de Bergerac
L'Autre Monde: ou les États et Empires de la Lune (Comical History of the States and Empires of the Moon) (1657) was the first of three satirical novels written by Cyrano de Bergerac that are considered among the first science fiction stories. Arthur C Clarke credited this book with conceiving of the ramjet, and being the first fictional example of a rocket-powered space flight.

René Lorin
The ramjet was conceived in 1913 by French inventor René Lorin, who was granted a patent for his device. Attempts to build a prototype failed due to inadequate materials. His patent FR290356 showed a piston internal combustion engine with added 'trumpets' as exhaust nozzles.

Albert Fonó

In 1915, Hungarian inventor Albert Fonó devised a solution for increasing the range of artillery, comprising a gun-launched projectile which was to be united with a ramjet propulsion unit, thus giving a long range from relatively low muzzle velocities, allowing heavy shells to be fired from relatively lightweight guns. Fonó submitted his invention to the Austro-Hungarian Army, but the proposal was rejected. After World War I, Fonó returned to the subject of jet propulsion, in May 1928 describing an "air-jet engine" which he described as being suitable for high-altitude supersonic aircraft, in a German patent application. In an additional patent application, he adapted the engine for subsonic speed. The patent was granted in 1932 after four years of examination (German Patent No. 554,906, 1932-11-02).

Soviet Union
In the Soviet Union, a theory of supersonic ramjet engines was presented in 1928 by Boris Stechkin. Yuri Pobedonostsev, chief of GIRD's 3rd Brigade, carried out a great deal of research into ramjet engines. The first engine, the GIRD-04, was designed by I.A. Merkulov and tested in April 1933. The GIRD-08 phosphorus-fueled ramjet was tested by firing it from an artillery cannon. These shells may have been the first jet-powered projectiles to break the speed of sound.

In 1939, Merkulov did further ramjet tests using a two-stage rocket, the R-3.  That August, he developed the first ramjet engine for use as an auxiliary motor of an aircraft, the DM-1. The world's first ramjet-powered airplane flight took place in December 1940, using two DM-2 engines on a modified Polikarpov I-15. Merkulov designed a ramjet fighter "Samolet D" in 1941, which was never completed.  Two of his DM-4 engines were installed on the Yak-7 PVRD fighter, during World War II. In 1940, the Kostikov-302 experimental plane was designed, powered by a liquid fuel rocket for take-off and ramjet engines for flight.  That project was cancelled in 1944.

In 1947, Mstislav Keldysh proposed a long-range antipodal bomber, similar to the Sänger-Bredt bomber, but powered by ramjet instead of rocket. In 1954, NPO Lavochkin and the Keldysh Institute began development of a Mach 3 ramjet-powered cruise missile, Burya.  This project competed with the R-7 ICBM being developed by Sergei Korolev, and was cancelled in 1957.

Russia 
On 1 March 2018 President Vladimir Putin announced Russia had developed a nuclear powered ramjet cruise missile capable of extended long range flight. It has been designated 9M730 "Burevestnik" (Petrel) by Russia and has the NATO reporting name SSC-X-9 "Skyfall". On 9 August 2019, an explosion and release of radioactive material was recorded at the State Central Navy Testing Range. Recovery efforts were underway to raise a test article which had landed in the White Sea during testing in 2018 when the nuclear power source of the missile detonated and killed 5 researchers.

Germany
In 1936, Hellmuth Walter constructed a test engine powered by natural gas. Theoretical work was carried out at BMW and Junkers, as well as DFL. In 1941, Eugen Sänger of DFL proposed a ramjet engine with a very high combustion chamber temperature. Later, with petrol becoming scarce in Germany due to wartime conditions, tests were carried out with blocks of pressed coal dust as a fuel (see e.g. Lippisch P.13a), which were not successful due to slow combustion.

United States

Stovepipe (flying/flaming/supersonic) was a popular name for the ramjet during the 1950s in trade magazines such as Aviation Week & Space Technology and other publications such as The Cornell Engineer and the Journal Of The American Rocket Society. The simplicity implied by the name came from a comparison with the turbojet engine which also has, together with the inlet, combustor and nozzle of a ramjet, complex and expensive spinning turbomachinery (compressor and turbine).

The US Navy developed a series of air-to-air missiles under the name of "Gorgon" using different propulsion mechanisms, including ramjet propulsion on the Gorgon IV. The ramjet Gorgon IVs, made by Glenn Martin, were tested in 1948 and 1949 at Naval Air Station Point Mugu. The ramjet engine itself was designed at the University of Southern California and manufactured by the Marquardt Aircraft Company.

In the early 1950s the US developed a Mach 4+ ramjet under the Lockheed X-7 program. This was developed into the Lockheed AQM-60 Kingfisher. Further development resulted in the Lockheed D-21 spy drone.

In the late 1950s the US Navy introduced a system called the RIM-8 Talos, which was a long range surface-to-air missile fired from ships. It successfully shot down several enemy fighters during the Vietnam war, and was the first ship-launched missile to destroy an enemy aircraft in combat. It was also used as a surface-to-surface weapon and was modified to destroy land-based radars.

Using the technology proven by the AQM-60, In the late 1950s and early 1960s the US produced a widespread defense system called the CIM-10 Bomarc, which was equipped with hundreds of nuclear armed ramjet missiles with a range of several hundred miles. It was powered by the same engines as the AQM-60, but with improved materials to withstand the longer flight times. The system was withdrawn in the 1970s as the threat from bombers was reduced.

THOR-ER
In April 2020, the U.S. Department of Defense and the Norwegian Ministry of Defense jointly announced their partnership to develop advanced technologies applicable to long range high-speed and hypersonic weapons. The Tactical High-speed Offensive Ramjet for Extended Range (THOR-ER) program completed a solid fuel ramjet (SFRJ) vehicle test in August 2022.

United Kingdom

In the late 1950s and early 1960s the UK developed several ramjet missiles.

A project called Blue Envoy was supposed to equip the country with a long range ramjet powered air defense against bombers, but the system was eventually cancelled.

It was replaced by a much shorter range ramjet missile system called the Bloodhound. The system was designed as a second line of defense in case attackers were able to bypass the fleet of defending English Electric Lightning fighters.

In the 1960s the Royal Navy developed and deployed a ramjet powered surface to air missile for ships called the Sea Dart. It was used successfully in combat against multiple types of aircraft during the Falklands War.

Fritz Zwicky
Eminent Swiss astrophysicist Fritz Zwicky was research director at Aerojet and holds many patents in jet propulsion. U.S. patents 5121670 and 4722261 are for ram accelerators. The U.S. Navy would not allow Fritz Zwicky to publicly discuss his own invention, U.S. Patent 2,461,797 for the Underwater Jet, a ram jet that performs in a fluid medium.  Time magazine reported Fritz Zwicky's work in the articles "Missed Swiss" on 11 July 1955 and "Underwater Jet" in the 14 March 1949 issue.

France

In France, the works of René Leduc were notable. Leduc's Model, the Leduc 0.10 was one of the first ramjet-powered aircraft to fly, in 1949.

The Nord 1500 Griffon reached  in 1958.

Engine cycle

Air as it passes through a ramjet duct changes state (eg changes in temperature, pressure, volume) as it is compressed, heated and expanded in a thermodynamic cycle known as the Brayton cycle. This cycle also applies to the gas turbine engine. For a fixed amount of air its change in state is represented with pairs of quantities on diagrams, usually temperature~entropy or pressure~volume. The cycle is named after George Brayton, the American engineer who developed it, although it was originally proposed and patented by Englishman John Barber in 1791. It is also sometimes known as the Joule cycle.

Design 

The first part of a ramjet is its diffuser (compressor) in which the forward motion of the ramjet is used to raise the pressure of its working fluid (air) as required for the combustion of fuel. It is then passed through a nozzle to accelerate it to supersonic speeds. This acceleration gives the ramjet forward thrust.

A ramjet is much less complex than a turbojet in so far as it comprises an air intake, a combustor, and a nozzle but no turbomachinery. Normally, the only moving parts are those in the fuel pump, which sends the fuel to the spray nozzles in the combustor (liquid-fuel ramjet). Solid-fuel ramjets are simpler with no need for a fuel system.

By way of comparison, a turbojet uses a compressor driven by a turbine. This type of engine produces thrust when stationary because the high velocity air required to produce compressed air (i.e. ram air in a ramjet) is produced by the compressor itself (fast spinning rotor blades).

Construction

Diffusers
The diffuser is that part of the ramjet which converts the high velocity of the air approaching the intake into high (static) pressure required for combustion. High combustion pressures minimize wasted thermal energy which appears in the exhaust gases (by reducing entropy rise during heat addition).

Subsonic and low-supersonic ramjets use a pitot-type entrance for the inlet to capture air. This is followed by a widening internal passage (subsonic diffuser) to achieve a lower subsonic velocity which is required at the combustor. At low supersonic speeds a normal (plane) shock wave forms in front of the inlet.

For higher supersonic speeds the pressure loss through a normal shock wave in front of the inlet becomes prohibitive and a protruding spike or cone has to be used to produce oblique shock waves in front of a final normal shock which now occurs at the inlet entrance lip. The diffuser in this case consists of two parts, the supersonic diffuser, with its shock waves external to the inlet, followed by the internal subsonic diffuser.

At higher speeds still, part of the supersonic diffusion has to take place internally so there are external and internal oblique shock waves. The final normal shock has to occur in the vicinity of a minimum flow area known as the throat, which is followed by the subsonic diffuser.

Combustor
As with other jet engines, the combustor has to raise the temperature of the air by burning fuel. This takes place with a small pressure loss. The air velocity entering the combustor has to be low enough such that continuous combustion can take place in sheltered zones provided by flame holders.

Normally, the combustor must be capable of operating over a wide range of throttle settings, for a range of flight speeds and altitudes. Usually, a sheltered pilot region enables combustion to continue when the vehicle intake undergoes high yaw/pitch during turns. Other flame stabilization techniques make use of flame holders, which vary in design from combustor cans to simple flat plates, to shelter the flame and improve fuel mixing. Over-fuelling the combustor can cause the final (normal) shock in the diffuser to be pushed forward beyond the intake lip, resulting in a substantial drop in engine airflow and thrust.

Nozzles
The propelling nozzle is a critical part of a ramjet design, since it accelerates exhaust flow to produce thrust.

Subsonic ramjets accelerate exhaust flow with a nozzle. Supersonic flight typically requires a convergent–divergent nozzle.

Performance and control

Above this speed, given sufficient initial flight velocity, a ramjet will be self-sustaining. Indeed, unless the vehicle drag is extremely high, the engine/airframe combination will tend to accelerate to higher and higher flight speeds, substantially increasing the air intake temperature. As this could have a detrimental effect on the integrity of the engine and/or airframe, the fuel control system must reduce engine fuel flow to stabilize the flight Mach number and, thereby, air intake temperature to reasonable levels.

Due to the stoichiometric combustion temperature, efficiency is usually good at high speeds (around ), whereas at low speeds the relatively poor pressure ratio means the ramjets are outperformed by turbojets, or even rockets.

Control
Ramjets can be classified according to the type of fuel, liquid or solid; and the booster.

In a liquid fuel ramjet (LFRJ), hydrocarbon fuel (typically) is injected into the combustor ahead of a flameholder which stabilises the flame resulting from the combustion of the fuel with the compressed air from the intake(s). A means of pressurizing and supplying the fuel to the ramcombustor is required, which can be complicated and expensive. Aérospatiale-Celerg designed an LFRJ where the fuel is forced into the injectors by an elastomer bladder which inflates progressively along the length of the fuel tank. Initially, the bladder forms a close-fitting sheath around the compressed air bottle from which it is inflated, which is mounted lengthwise in the tank. This offers a lower-cost approach than a regulated LFRJ requiring a turbopump and associated hardware to supply the fuel.

A ramjet generates no static thrust and needs a booster to achieve a forward velocity high enough for efficient operation of the intake system. The first ramjet-powered missiles used external boosters, usually solid-propellant rockets, either in tandem, where the booster is mounted immediately aft of the ramjet, e.g. Sea Dart, or wraparound where multiple boosters are attached alongside the outside of the ramjet, e.g. 2K11 Krug. The choice of booster arrangement is usually driven by the size of the launch platform. A tandem booster increases the overall length of the system, whereas wraparound boosters increase the overall diameter. Wraparound boosters will usually generate higher drag than a tandem arrangement.

Integrated boosters provide a more efficient packaging option, since the booster propellant is cast inside the otherwise empty combustor. This approach has been used on solid, for example 2K12 Kub, liquid, for example ASMP, and ducted rocket, for example Meteor, designs. Integrated designs are complicated by the different nozzle requirements of the boost and ramjet phases of flight. Due to the higher thrust levels of the booster, a differently shaped nozzle is required for optimum thrust compared to that required for the lower thrust ramjet sustainer. This is usually achieved via a separate nozzle, which is ejected after booster burnout. However, designs such as Meteor feature nozzleless boosters. This offers the advantages of elimination of the hazard to launch aircraft from the ejected boost nozzle debris, simplicity, reliability, and reduced mass and cost, although this must be traded against the reduction in performance compared with that provided by a dedicated booster nozzle.

Integral rocket ramjet/ducted rocket

A slight variation on the ramjet uses the supersonic exhaust from a rocket combustion process to compress and react with the incoming air in the main combustion chamber. This has the advantage of giving thrust even at zero speed.

In a solid fuel integrated rocket ramjet (SFIRR), the solid fuel is cast along the outer wall of the ramcombustor. In this case, fuel injection is through ablation of the propellant by the hot compressed air from the intake(s). An aft mixer may be used to improve combustion efficiency. SFIRRs are preferred over LFRJs for some applications because of the simplicity of the fuel supply, but only when the throttling requirements are minimal, i.e. when variations in altitude or Mach number are limited.

In a ducted rocket, a solid fuel gas generator produces a hot fuel-rich gas which is burnt in the ramcombustor with the compressed air supplied by the intake(s). The flow of gas improves the mixing of the fuel and air and increases total pressure recovery. In a throttleable ducted rocket, also known as a variable flow ducted rocket, a valve allows the gas generator exhaust to be throttled allowing control of the thrust. Unlike an LFRJ, solid propellant ramjets cannot flame out. The ducted rocket sits somewhere between the simplicity of the SFRJ and the unlimited throttleability of the LFRJ.

Flight speed 

Ramjets generally give little or no thrust below about half the speed of sound, and they are inefficient (Specific Impulse of less than 600 seconds) until the airspeed exceeds  due to low compression ratios.

Even above the minimum speed, a wide flight envelope (range of flight conditions), such as low to high speeds and low to high altitudes, can force significant design compromises, and they tend to work best optimised for one designed speed and altitude (point designs). However, ramjets generally outperform gas turbine-based jet engine designs and work best at supersonic speeds (Mach 2–4). Although inefficient at slower speeds, they are more fuel-efficient than rockets over their entire useful working range up to at least .

The performance of conventional ramjets falls off above Mach 6 due to dissociation and pressure loss caused by shock as the incoming air is slowed to subsonic velocities for combustion. In addition, the combustion chamber's inlet temperature increases to very high values, approaching the dissociation limit at some limiting Mach number.

Related engines

Air turboramjet

An air turboramjet has a compressor powered by a gas heated via a heat exchanger within the combustion chamber.

Supersonic-combustion ramjets (scramjets)

Ramjet diffusers slow the incoming air to a subsonic velocity before it enters the combustor. Scramjets are similar to ramjets, but the air flows through the combustor at supersonic speed. This increases the stagnation pressure recovered from the freestream and improves net thrust. Thermal choking of the exhaust is avoided by having a relatively high supersonic air velocity at combustor entry. Fuel injection is often into a sheltered region below a step in the combustor wall. The Boeing X-43 was a small experimental ramjet which achieved  for 200 seconds on the X-51A Waverider.

Standing oblique detonation ramjets (Sodramjets)
Standing oblique detonation ramjets (Sodramjets) replace the diffusive ramjet combustion with an oblique detonation. See also: Shcramjet
Criteria for hypersonic airbreathing propulsion and its experimental verification
Oblique Detonation Wave Ramjet

Precooled engines

A variant of the pure ramjet is the 'combined cycle' engine, intended to overcome the limitations of the pure ramjet. One example of this is the SABRE engine; this uses a precooler, behind which is the ramjet and turbine machinery.

The ATREX engine developed in Japan is an experimental implementation of this concept. It uses liquid hydrogen fuel in a fairly exotic single-fan arrangement.  The liquid hydrogen fuel is pumped through a heat exchanger in the air intake, simultaneously heating the liquid hydrogen and cooling the incoming air. This cooling of the incoming air is critical to achieving a reasonable efficiency. The hydrogen then continues through a second heat exchanger position after the combustion section, where the hot exhaust is used to further heat the hydrogen, turning it into a very high pressure gas. This gas is then passed through the tips of the fan to provide driving power to the fan at subsonic speeds. After mixing with the air, it is burned in the combustion chamber.

The Reaction Engines Scimitar has been proposed for the LAPCAT hypersonic airliner, and the Reaction Engines SABRE for the Reaction Engines Skylon spaceplane.

Nuclear-powered ramjet 

During the Cold War, the United States designed and ground-tested a nuclear-powered ramjet called Project Pluto.  This system, intended for use in a cruise missile, used no combustion; a high-temperature, unshielded nuclear reactor heated the air instead.  The ramjet was predicted to be able to fly at supersonic speeds for months.  Because the reactor was unshielded, it was dangerous to anyone in or around the flight path of the low-flying vehicle (although the exhaust itself wasn't radioactive).  The project was ultimately cancelled because ICBMs seemed to serve the purpose better.

Ionospheric ramjet
The upper atmosphere above about  contains monatomic oxygen produced by the sun through photochemistry. A concept was created by NASA for recombining this thin gas back to diatomic molecules at orbital speeds to power a ramjet.

Bussard ramjet

The Bussard ramjet is a spacecraft propulsion concept intended to fuse interstellar wind and exhaust it at high speed from the rear of the vehicle.

Ramjet mode for an afterburning turbojet

An afterburning turbojet or bypass engine can be described as transitioning from turbo to ramjet mode if it can attain a flight speed at which the engine pressure ratio (epr) has fallen to one. The turbo afterburner then acts as a ramburner. The intake ram pressure is present at entry to the afterburner but is no longer augmented with a pressure rise from the turbomachinery. Further increase in speed introduces a pressure loss due to the presence of the turbomachinery as the epr drops below one.

A notable example was the propulsion system for the Lockheed SR-71 Blackbird with an epr= 0.9 at Mach 3.2. The thrust required, airflow and exhaust temperature, to reach this speed came from a standard method for increasing airflow through a compressor running at low corrected speeds, compressor bleed, and being able to increase the afterburner temperature as a result of cooling the duct and nozzle using the air taken from the compressor rather than the usual, much hotter, turbine exhaust gas.

Aircraft using ramjets 
 
Hiller Hornet (a ramjet-powered helicopter)
NHI H-3 Kolibrie (helicopter)
Focke-Wulf Super Lorin
Focke-Wulf Ta 283
Focke-Wulf Triebflügel 
Leduc experimental aircraft
Lockheed D-21
Lockheed X-7, 1950 test vehicles
AQM-60 Kingfisher, X-7 derived target vehicles using Marquardt XRJ43-MA ramjet 
Nord 1500 Griffon
Republic XF-103, design, to use Wright J67 turbojet + RJ55-W-1 ramjet, never built 
Skoda-Kauba Sk P.14

Missiles using ramjets 
 
2K11 Krug
2K12 Kub
ASM-3
Bristol Bloodhound
BrahMos
CIM-10 Bomarc
Orbital Sciences GQM-163 Coyote
Hsiung Feng III
Kh-31
MBDA ASMP
MBDA Meteor
P-270 Moskit
P-800 Oniks 
Bendix RIM-8 Talos
Sea Dart missile
North American SM-64 Navaho
Solid Fuel Ducted Ramjet
YJ-12

See also 
 Aircraft engine
 Jet aircraft
 Jet engine performance
 Liquid air cycle engine
 Turbofan
 Turbojet

 Wikibooks: Jet propulsion

References 

 enginehistory org document about Lorin Ramjet

Bibliography
 Hallion, Richard P. "The Soviet Stovepipes". Air Enthusiast, No. 9, February–May 1979, pp. 55–60. .

 enginehistory org document about Lorin Ramjet

External links

NASA ramjet information and model
 "Riding The Ramjet"  January 1949, Popular Mechanics article that covers the USAF first experiment with ramjets on a P-80 fighter
The Boeing Logbook: 2002–2004
Design notes on a ramjet-powered helicopter
Extensive overview on ramjets and scramjets by French ONERA

Hungarian inventions
 
Jet engines